The 1997 Boston University Terriers football team was an American football team that represented Boston University as a member of the Atlantic 10 Conference during the 1997 NCAA Division I-AA football season. In their second season under head coach Tom Masella, the Terriers compiled a 1–10 record (1–7 against conference opponents), tied for last place in the Atlantic 10's New England Division, and were outscored by a total of 353 to 162.

In late October 1997, Boston University announced that its trustees had voted to drop its football program at the end of the 1997 season. The move was announced as part of a restructuring plan that called for increased funding of women's sports.

Schedule

References

Boston University
Boston University Terriers football seasons
Boston University Terriers football